Hope Botanical Gardens, also known as the Royal Botanical Gardens, is a  park and gardens located in St Andrew, Jamaica.

History
Major Richard Hope's estate was established after 1655 when the British took over Jamaica from the Spanish.  Richard Hope was a commander in the British Army and received his estate due to his assistance in gaining control of Jamaica.
It was developed as a sugar plantation with a watermill.

In the 19th century the property was inherited by Richard Temple-Nugent-Brydges-Chandos-Grenville, 2nd Duke of Buckingham and Chandos.
According to the Legacies of British Slave-Ownership research centre at University College London, Buckingham was the beneficiary of payment as a slave owner in the aftermath of the Slavery Abolition Act 1833 with the Slave Compensation Act 1837.

The gardens were established in 1873 from a section of the estate.

Attractions
Attractions at the gardens include a palm grove, a cactus garden, an orchid house, and ornamental ponds. This site is maintained by the Ministry of Agriculture and Fisheries (Jamaica).

References

Botanical gardens in Jamaica